Oleksiy Kurilov (born 24 April 1988) is a professional Ukrainian football defender.

Career
Kurilov is the product of the Shakhtar Donetsk youth school system. In Shakhtar, Kurylov played in 17 games in the Reserves, one in Shakhtar II and 10 games for Shakhtar III. He was bought by Metalist during the 2006–2007 season in 2007, however was put in Metalist Reserves. Myron Markevych promoted Oleksiy Kurilov to the senior team during the 2007–08 season, where he gave his debut in the Ukrainian Premier League. In the winter break 2008–09 he was transferred to Zorya Luhansk.

Kurilov left Shakhter Karagandy on 17 June 2016.

National team
Oleksiy Kurilov has been a regular defender in the Ukrainian Under-19 National Football Team, playing 20 international matches and netting on goal. He also played on game for the Ukrainian Under-20 National Team where he scored 1 goal in 1 game. He was promoted by Pavel Yakovenko to the Ukrainian Under-21 National Football Team.

References

External links

Profile at Cimean Football Union

1988 births
Living people
People from Kerch
Ukrainian footballers
Ukraine youth international footballers
Ukraine under-21 international footballers
Association football defenders
Ukrainian expatriate footballers
Expatriate footballers in Kazakhstan
Expatriate footballers in Russia
Expatriate footballers in Belarus
Ukrainian expatriate sportspeople in Kazakhstan
Ukrainian expatriate sportspeople in Russia
Ukrainian Premier League players
Ukrainian First League players
Ukrainian Second League players
FC Shakhtar Donetsk players
FC Shakhtar-2 Donetsk players
FC Shakhtar-3 Donetsk players
FC Metalist Kharkiv players
FC Zorya Luhansk players
FC Volyn Lutsk players
SC Tavriya Simferopol players
FC Vorskla Poltava players
FC Metalurh Zaporizhzhia players
FC Kyzyltash Bakhchisaray players
Crimean Premier League players
FC Shakhter Karagandy players
FC Fakel Voronezh players
FC Slutsk players
FC Okean Kerch players